Jan Ernst Matzeliger (September 15, 1852 – August 24, 1889) was an inventor whose lasting machine brought significant change to the manufacturing of shoes.

Biography 

Matzeliger was born in Dutch Guiana, now Suriname. His father, Ernst Matzeliger, was a third generation Dutchman of German descent living in the Dutch Guiana capital city of Paramaribo. He owned and operated the Colonial Shipworks that had been in his family for three generations. His mother was a house slave of African descent; she lived on the plantation of which his father was the owner for a time. At the age of ten, Jan Matzeliger was apprenticed in the Colonial Ship Works in Paramaribo, where he demonstrated a natural aptitude for machinery and mechanics. He left Dutch Guiana at age 19, and worked as a mechanic on a Dutch East Indies merchant ship for several years before settling in Philadelphia, Pennsylvania, where he first learned the shoe trade. By 1877, he spoke adequate English (Dutch was his native tongue) and moved to Massachusetts to pursue his interest in the shoe industry. He eventually went to work in the Harney Brothers Shoe factory.

In the early days of shoemaking, shoes were made mainly by hand. For proper fit, the customer's feet had to be duplicated in size and form by creating a stone or wooden mold called a "last" from which the shoes were sized and shaped. Since the greatest difficulty in shoemaking was the actual assembly of the soles to the upper shoe, it required great skill to tack and sew the two components together. It was thought that such intricate work could only be done by skilled human hands. As a result, this phase was not yet mechanized and shoe lasters held great power over the shoe industry. They would hold work stoppages without regard for their fellow workers' desires, resulting in long periods of unemployment for them.

After five years of work, Matzeliger obtained a patent for his invention of an automated shoe laster in 1883. A skilled hand laster could produce 50 pairs in a ten-hour day. Matzeliger's machine could produce between 150 and 700 pairs of shoes a day, cutting shoe prices across the nation in half.

Death and legacy 
Matzeliger sacrificed his health working exhausting hours on his invention and not eating over long periods of time. He caught a cold which quickly developed into tuberculosis. His early death in Lynn, Massachusetts from this disease meant he never saw the full profit of his invention. He died on August 24, 1889, three weeks shy of his 37th birthday.

Matzeliger's invention was perhaps "the most important invention for New England." His invention was "the greatest forward step in the shoe industry," according to the church bulletin of The First Church of Christ (the same church that took him as a member) as part of a commemoration held in 1967 in his honor. Yet, because of the color of his skin, he was not mentioned in the history books until recently. In fact, contemporaries referred to him as the "Dutch nigger" and his machine as the "niggerhead laster," a term used in the apparel industry at the time for a certain type of fabric.

A 29-cent US postal stamp was issued on September 15, 1991, in honor of Matzeliger. Designed by Barbara Higgins Bond, the stamp depicts Matzeliger and is a part of the Black Heritage Stamp Series.

Patents
  274,307, 3/20/1883, Automatic method for lasting shoe
   421,954, 2/25/1890, Nailing machine
   423,937, 3/25/1890, Tack separating and distributing mechanism
   459,899, 9/22/1891, Lasting machine
   415,726, 11/26/1899, Mechanism for distributing tacks, nails, etc.

See also
United Shoe Machinery Corporation

References

External links
 Engineering and Technology: Jan Matzeliger
 Encyclopædia Britannica's Guide to Black History

1852 births
1889 deaths
African-American inventors
19th-century American inventors
Surinamese emigrants to the United States
Surinamese people of Dutch descent
19th-century deaths from tuberculosis
Tuberculosis deaths in Massachusetts
People from Paramaribo